The discography of the South Korean multinational girl group f(x) consists of four studio albums, two extended plays, one reissue album, one video album, fifteen singles, two promotional single and four soundtrack appearances.

f(x) formed by SM and debuted in  September 2009 with the digital single "La Cha Ta" and two month later, they released their first physical single "Chu~♡". In 2010, their first EP Nu ABO was released. The single "Nu ABO" peaked number one on Gaon Chart.  In 2011, the group released their first studio album  Pinnochio, which was later re-released as Hot Summer in the same year. The album spawned two more singles: "Pinnochio (Danger)" and "Hot Summer" reached number one and two on Gaon Chart. The album was listed as one of the best-selling album of 2011 and also the single "Hot Summer" became one of the best-selling single of 2011. Their second EP Electric Shock (2012) and second studio album Pink Tape (2013) reached number one. The single "Electric Shock" from the second EP and "Rum Pum Pum Pum" from the second studio album all peaked atop South Korea's singles chart. Their album Pink Tape (2013) also garnered widespread critical acclaim with became the only K-pop album to be featured on US music channel Fuse's "41 Best Albums of 2013" and was named the "Greatest K-pop Album of the 2010s" by Billboard. 

f(x) debuted in Japan with released the Japanese versions of their singles "Hot Summer". The single was re-released in their first Japanese single called "Summer Special: Pinocchio / Hot Summer in 2015. In 2016, their second Japanese single "4 Walls / Cowboy" was released.

Albums

Studio albums

Reissues

Video albums

Extended plays

Singles

Promotional singles

Other charted songs

Music videos

See also
 List of songs recorded by f(x)

References 

Discography
Discographies of South Korean artists
K-pop music group discographies